Canada Games was a Canadian games manufacturing company, originally based in Brampton, Ontario, before moving to nearby Concord.  Its slogan was "The Best in Fun from Canada Games."

It's notable that despite being a far smaller company than its American competition, the Canada Games Company was able to remain a force in the market for many years.

Its products included toys, board games and puzzles, particularly those related to popular movies and television shows.

The company's most popular item was Pogs. With the end of the Pogs fad, Canada Games went out of business in 1997.

Canada Games in its 14-year history  produced a large number of items still commonly found on store shelves especially in smaller towns. They were aggressive in getting licensing rights for Canada for certain items and appeared to have taken over other companies as they progressed.

Games
Five in a Row
Tye Dye Teddy
Pogs
Stock Ticker
Zeddy Jigsaw Puzzles
VCR Hockey Night in Canada
CFL Canadian Armchair Football
InQUIZitive
Gotta Second
Face to Face
How to Host a Murder - Class of '54 (or "The Return of Rock N. Roley")
How to Host a Mystery - Star Trek: The Next Generation
Rummoli
Disney Story-Boards
Mighty Morphin Power Rangers: Gigantik Game
Balderdash
Biker Mice From Mars
Jabberwocky
Trivia Challenge
Beyond the Grave (An Evening of Murder Party Game)
Traveler Safari (How to host a Scavenger Hunt)
Modern Backgammon
Batman: The Animated Series Gigantik Crime Wave Game
Mighty Morphin Power Rangers: Attack of the Putty Patrol Box Game
Gargoyles Gigantik Game
a Question of Scruples - 90's edition
Siege

McMichael Canadian Art Collection Jigsaw Puzzles
Group of Seven 1000 Pieces Jigsaw Puzzles with 19" inch by 28" poster included - 4 titles
Alexander Young Jackson: Church at St.Urbain, 1931
Thomas John Thomson: Afternoon, Algonquin Park, 1914
James Edward Hervey MacDonald: Forest Wilderness, 1921
Alfred Joseph Casson: White Pine, 1957

References

Defunct toy manufacturers
Toy companies of Canada
Jigsaw puzzle manufacturers